The Blériot XLII was a First World War French reconnaissance plane designed and built by Blériot.

Design
The crew was housed in a partially armored cabin. A small window was installed in front of the fuselage to facilitate observation. For reconnaissance, the observer lay horizontally on the cabin floor.

Development 
The Bleriot XLII was built in March 1913 for use as a reconnaissance and observation aircraft. It was a double mid-flight, equipped with an 80 hp Gnome engine. The Bleriot XLII passed the test cycle, but the military was not interested.

Specifications

References

1910s French military reconnaissance aircraft
XLII
Monoplanes
Aircraft first flown in 1913
Rotary-engined aircraft